Chrysophyllum paranaense is a tree in the family Sapotaceae, native to Brazil.

Description
The species is locally used for its timber and fruit.

Distribution and habitat
Chrysophyllum paranaense is native to the Brazilian states of São Paulo and Paraná. Its habitat is in lowland coastal forests.

References

paranaense
Flora of São Paulo (state)
Flora of Paraná (state)
Plants described in 1990